Salvatierra de Esca (in Aragonese: Salvatierra d'Esca) is a municipality located in the province of Zaragoza, Aragon, Spain. According to the 2004 census (INE), the municipality has a population of 269 inhabitants.

Villages
Salvatierra de Esca
Lorbés

References

Municipalities in the Province of Zaragoza